Per Jacobsson (5 February 1894 – 5 May 1963) was a Swedish economist who served as the managing director of the International Monetary Fund (IMF) from 1956 until his death in 1963. 

Born in Tanum, Bohuslän, Jacobsson received degrees in law and economics from the Uppsala University. 

He was employed at the League of Nations from 1920 to 1928, and later the Bank of International Settlements from 1931 onward. In December 1956, he was appointed as the managing director of the International Monetary Fund (IMF), a position he held until his death on 5 May 1963. He was buried in the Swedish section of Brookwood Cemetery.

Jacobsson was an elected an International Member of the American Philosophical Society in 1957.

Jacobsson's daughter Moyra, an artist, married Roger Bannister, the British Olympic athlete and neurologist who was the first person to run the four-minute mile.

Gallery

References

External links

Biography – Per Jacobsson Foundation

1894 births
1963 deaths
People from Tanum Municipality
Managing directors of the International Monetary Fund
Uppsala University alumni
20th-century Swedish businesspeople
Swedish economists
Burials at Brookwood Cemetery
Members of the Första kammaren
Swedish officials of the United Nations

Members of the American Philosophical Society